Fountain Lake Farm, also known as the Wisconsin Farm Home of John Muir, is a historic farm and National Historic Landmark in rural Montello, Wisconsin, United States. The landmark covers part of the farm that was the home of pioneering conservationist John Muir from 1849 to 1856 and 1860 to 1862. Covering , the landmarked area is partly private property and partly in John Muir Memorial County Park, a minimally developed public park.

Description and history
John Muir came to the United States in 1849 as an eleven-year-old immigrant with his father, who established a farm in Marquette County, Wisconsin. Muir explored Fountain Lake, partially on the farm property and the farm's namesake, and the ecosystems that surrounded it. The family farmstead was located on a knoll in the northeastern portion of the acreage  that makes up the landmark designation.

The landmarked area is a rectangle consisting of those southern 80 acres of the Muir property. It is bounded on the north by Gillette Drive, and includes of a parcel of private land at its northeast corner, as well as the northeastern part of the county's John Muir Memorial Park. The southern and western portions of the landmarked area are accessible via a trail that encircles the lake and via a parking area on County Road F. There are no standing structures in the landmarked area that date to the Muir's ownership, although some trees survive from the Muir period.

See also
List of National Historic Landmarks in Wisconsin
National Register of Historic Places listings in Marquette County, Wisconsin

References

External links
https://fountainlakefarm.wixsite.com/flfnhl
https://www.youtube.com/playlist?list=PLBdcfhvnJYNEr2W6a3hL09xtTDuQqywVL
John Muir, Fountain Lake Farm
Muir Park Trail Map and Guide

John Muir
National Historic Landmarks in Wisconsin
Tourist attractions in Marquette County, Wisconsin
Farms on the National Register of Historic Places in Wisconsin
National Register of Historic Places in Marquette County, Wisconsin